Vegas Throat is the debut studio album of the American noise rock band Barkmarket, released in 1991 by Triple X Records. It was reissued in 1992 on Rick Rubin's Def American label with an alternate track listing and the song " Ten Convictions". The album's title is a colloquial term describing a chronic sore throat attributed by singers and performers to the dry desert air in Las Vegas, Nevada.

Reception

Stewart Mason of allmusic gave it 3 out of 5 stars, claiming "the rough edges of this album add to its charm", although noting that later releases perfected the band's sound.

Track listing

Personnel
Adapted from the Vegas Throat liner notes.

Barkmarket
John Nowlin – bass guitar, sampler, recording (12)
Dave Sardy – lead vocals, guitar, production, recording
Rock Savage – drums, pipe

Additional musicians and production
Marc Ribot – guitar (5)
Syd Straw – backing vocals (5)
Howie Weinberg – mastering

Release history

References

External links 
 

1991 debut albums
Triple X Records albums
American Recordings (record label) albums
Barkmarket albums
Albums produced by Dave Sardy